Greenport is the terminus of the Main Line (Greenport Branch) of the Long Island Rail Road. It is officially located at Wiggins Street and Fourth Street in the Village of Greenport, New York, although the property spans as far east as 3rd Street and the Shelter Island North Ferry terminal.

History
Greenport station opened on July 29, 1844,as the terminus of the Main line of the LIRR, although some in the industry had hope of building an extension to a cross-sound bridge. The station was listed as Green–Port on the 1852 timetable. On July 4, 1870, it was burned as part of Town festivities, and was rebuilt in October later that year. Another station was built in its place in 1892 (although some sources claim it was in 1894), with a distinguished ticket office bay window that was removed in the 1920s. A train shed also existed behind the turntable, which was replaced by a coal deposit area. Steam service existed until June 5, 1955, mail was carried at the station until 1965, and the train ran onto a dock until 1978. A ticket booth with a station agent closed at Greenport on October 1, 1967. The station, its freight house, and turntable were placed on the National Register of Historic Places as a national historic district on July 20, 1989. A high-level island platform leading to the old station and the Shelter Island Ferry was built between 1999 and 2000, as the case was with many other railroad stations on Long Island. The former freight house serves as the east end of the Railroad Museum of Long Island, while the old station is now the East End Seaport Museum.

Station layout
This station has one high-level island platform long enough for one and a half cars to receive and discharge passengers. There is an additional siding south of Track 2.

Gallery

References

External links 

 Last Steam Train to Greenport; June 5, 1955 (Unofficial LIRR History Website)
 National Railway Historical Society (Twin Forks Chapter)
 Greenport Station History (Steve Lynch's LIRR Maps, Photos, Charts, etc.) (TrainsAreFun.com)
 Arrt's Archives
 By Rails to the Sea; Greenport - Page 1
 By Rails to the Sea; Greenport - Page 2
 By Rails to the Sea; Greenport - Page 3
 Station from Google Maps Street View

Long Island Rail Road stations in Suffolk County, New York
Southold, New York
Railway stations in the United States opened in 1844
Railway stations on the National Register of Historic Places in New York (state)
National Register of Historic Places in Suffolk County, New York
Museums in Suffolk County, New York
Historic districts on the National Register of Historic Places in New York (state)